The First Time is a 1969 American coming of age comedy-drama film directed by James Neilson and starring Jacqueline Bisset. Filming started in July 1968 as Beginners Three.

Plot
Three teen guys decide to lose their virginity. Some really want to and some are peer pressured into it. They're sent on a wild goose chase.

Cast
 Jacqueline Bisset as Anna
 Wes Stern as Kenny
 Rick Kelman as Mike
 Wink Roberts as Tommy
 Gerard Parkes as Charles
 Cosette Lee as Grandmother
 Sharon Acker as Pamela Williams

Filming locations
 Niagara Falls, Ontario, Toronto, Ontario and Kleinburg, Ontario

See also
 List of American films of 1969

References

External links
 

1969 films
1960s coming-of-age comedy-drama films
American coming-of-age comedy-drama films
American sex comedy films
1960s English-language films
Films about virginity
Films directed by James Neilson
Films produced by Allan Carr
Films scored by Kenyon Hopkins
Films shot in Toronto
Films with screenplays by Jo Heims
Niagara Falls in fiction
United Artists films
1960s sex comedy films
1960s teen films
Teen sex comedy films
Juvenile sexuality in films
1960s American films